Langarishoh is a village and jamoat in Tajikistan. It is located in Tojikobod District, one of the Districts of Republican Subordination. The jamoat has a total population of 10,360 (2015).

References

Populated places in Districts of Republican Subordination
Jamoats of Tajikistan